Cristian Mungiu (born 27 April 1968) is a Romanian filmmaker. He won the Palme d'Or at the 2007 Cannes Film Festival for his film 4 Months, 3 Weeks and 2 Days, which he wrote and directed. He has also won the awards for Best Screenplay and Best Director, at the 2012 and 2016 Cannes Film Festivals, for his films Beyond the Hills and Graduation.

Early life
Mungiu was born in Iași. His sister is political analyst Alina Mungiu-Pippidi. After studying English literature at the University of Iaşi, he worked for a few years as a teacher and as a journalist. After that, he enrolled at the University of Film in Bucharest to study film directing. After graduating in 1998, Mungiu made several short films.

Career 
In 2002, he debuted with his first feature film, Occident, which enjoyed critical success, winning prizes in several film festivals and being featured in Director's Fortnight at the 2002 Cannes Film Festival.

In 2007, Mungiu wrote and directed his second feature, 4 Months, 3 Weeks and 2 Days. The film was received enthusiastically, attracting critical praise and being selected in the official competition at the 2007 Cannes Film Festival, where it won the Palme d'Or for feature film, marking the first time that prize was awarded to a Romanian filmmaker.

His 2012 film Beyond the Hills was screened in competition at the 2012 Cannes Film Festival where Mungiu won the award for Best Screenplay and Cristina Flutur and Cosmina Stratan shared the award for Best Actress. The film was also selected as the Romanian entry for the Best Foreign Language Oscar at the 85th Academy Awards, making the January shortlist.

In 2013, he produced the next film of Nae Caranfil, 6.9 on Richter. In April 2013, he was selected as a member of the main competition jury at the 2013 Cannes Film Festival.

In 2016, he directed a tragedy, Graduation, which premiered at the 2016 Cannes Film Festival. The film was in competition for the Palme d'Or. It did not win, but Mungiu won the award for Best Director.

Mungiu was the Jury President of the Semaine de la Critique non-competitive section of the 2021 Cannes Film Festival.

At the 2022 Cannes Film Festival, Munjiu's feature R.M.N. was selected to compete for the Palme d'Or. The film's coproducers include the Dardenne brothers' Les Films du Fleuve.

Influences and style 
Mungiu has said that Miloš Forman and Robert Altman are important filmmakers who influenced him. He also respects the realism of Bicycle Thieves, among other famous realistic films.

Awards and nominations

Honours
 Romanian Royal Family: 70th Knight of the Royal Decoration of the Cross of the Romanian Royal House

Filmography as director
 2000 
 Corul pompierilor (short)
 Nicio întâmplare (short)
 Zapping (short)
 2002 – Occident
 2005 – Lost and Found - segment Turkey Girl
 2007 – 4 Months, 3 Weeks and 2 Days 
 2009 – Tales from the Golden Age
 2012 – Beyond the Hills
 2016 – Graduation
 2022 – R.M.N.

See also
 Romanian New Wave

References

External links

 (Romanian) 7 scenarii (7 Scripts), Editura LiterNet - screenplays volume by Cristian Mungiu
interview with 4 Months, 3 Weeks and 2 Days director Cristian Mungiu at -films.net
 In-depth analyses of Mungiu's films and of 4 Months, 3 Weeks and 2 Days 

1968 births
Living people
Romanian film directors
Caragiale National University of Theatre and Film alumni
Cannes Film Festival Award for Best Director winners
Directors of Palme d'Or winners
European Film Award for Best Director winners
Alexandru Ioan Cuza University alumni
Film people from Iași
Cannes Film Festival Award for Best Screenplay winners